Claude Fournier may refer to:

 Claude Fournier (revolutionary) (1745–1825), French personality of the Revolution
 Claude Fournier (filmmaker) (1931–2023), Canadian film director, screenwriter, editor and cinematographer